Odd Karsten Tveit (born 17 December 1945) is a Norwegian journalist, writer and economist. His speciality is the Middle East, a subject on which he has written several books. Tveit has been a foreign correspondent for the Norwegian Broadcasting Corporation (NRK) in the Middle East through three periods, from 1979 to 1983, from 1990 to 1994, and from 2003 to 2007.

Tveit has also served as a major in the UNIFIL peacekeeping forces in Lebanon.



Biography
Tveit has worked as a journalist for the Norwegian Broadcasting Corporation since 1973. To begin with he covered petroleum development in the North Sea. From 1977 Tveit has been attached to NRK's foreign editorial office ("utenriksredaksjonen").

Foreign correspondent

Cairo 1978

Tveit's first assignment as a foreign correspondent was in Cairo in 1978, a short-term replacement for Kjell Gjøstein Resi.

Beirut 1979–1983

When Tveit started on his first permanent period as a foreign correspondent for NRK, in 1979, he relocated NRK's office from Cairo to Beirut. Tveit stayed in Beirut until 1983.

Amman 1990–1994

During his next period as a Middle East correspondent, 1990–1994, the NRK office was based in Amman.

Amman 2003–2007

Tveit was again Middle East correspondent for NRK from 2003 to 2007, when the office was based in Amman.
In 2007 Sidsel Wold was assigned as NRK's new correspondent after Tveit had finished his period in Amman.

Gullruten award
Tveit was responsible for the documentary program Brennpunkt: Sporene etter Sharon ("Focus: Tracks after Sharon"), broadcast by NRK in 2002. This program received the Gullruten award for best TV documentary in 2002.

Books
Tveit wrote three books on energy politics in the early 1970s. From the mid-1980s the theme for his books has been the Middle East. He issued the book Alt for Israel. Oslo-Jerusalem 1948–1978 ("All for Israel") in 1996, and Krig og diplomati. Oslo-Jerusalem 1978–1996 ("War and Diplomacy") in 2005. He was awarded the Brage Prize for non-fiction in 2005, for Krig og diplomati.

Bibliography

Translations

References

External links
 Odd Karsten Tveit on Amazon.com (Retrieved on 14 October 2008)

1945 births
Living people
Norwegian television reporters and correspondents
Norwegian non-fiction writers
NRK people
Norwegian military personnel